The village of Dalton is a small settlement about  southeast of Dumfries and  south of Lockerbie, in Dumfries and Galloway, Scotland.

The village has an 18th-century church, one of its past ministers being The Rev. John W. Morris MA, who is buried near the southern boundary of the church. Several families have lived here for more than 150 years, including the: Byers, Bells (Almagill), Shuttleworths (Almagill), Carruthers (Dormont), Murrays (Murraythwaite), and Steels (Kirkwood). Dalton has a Thai restaurant and pub, and a well used village hall.

On the farms around Dalton, there are several self-catering, stone-built, holiday cottages at Kirkwood - offering tourist accommodation and walking, as well as fishing on the River Annan.

References

Villages in Dumfries and Galloway
Parishes in Dumfries and Galloway